In France, the Tribunal d'instance (literally "Court of First Instance") is a judicial lower court of record of first instance for general civil suits and includes a criminal division, the Police Court (tribunal de police), which hears cases of misdemeanors or summary offences (contraventions). Since it has original jurisdiction, the Court's rulings may be appealed to a French appellate court or Supreme Court. The court was formerly known as a Justice of the Peace Court (justice de paix) until the judicial restructuring of 1958.

In the Court, proceedings are conducted based on oral testimony and arguments, and, unlike in higher courts, legal counsel is not mandatory.

Other judicial courts of original jurisdiction are:
Magistrate courts (juge de proximité) - for small claims and petty misdemeanors (since 1 July 2017 these claims now fall under the jurisdiction of the tribunal d'instance)
High courts (tribunal de grande instance) - handles complex suits and has a criminal section, the Criminal Court (tribunal correctionnel), that hears cases involving minor felonies or indictable offences (délits)
Commercial court (Tribunal de commerce)
Employment Tribunal (Conseil des prud'hommes)
Agricultural Land Tribunal (tribunal paritaire des baux ruraux)
Social security tribunal (tribunal des affaires de sécurité sociale)

Degrees of jurisdiction
As a general rule, the French court system is divided into three degrees of jurisdiction:

 Original or general jurisdiction for the first hearing of cases; 
 Appellate jurisdiction for appeals from lower courts; 
 Courts of last resort for appeals from appellate courts on the interpretation of law.

Duties
The Court has civil jurisdiction over personal property claims, monetary claims not exceeding 10,000 euros, and other civil actions for which the court has exclusive jurisdiction, those being:  
 Private property leases
 Disputes relating to the elections of personnel delegates.
 the distance questions and height of the plantations.
 the movable credit to the consumption up to €21,500.
 Asset seizure
 Defamation suits
 Guardianship of minors and disabled persons
 Voter registration

Claims over 10,000 euros, unless in the above exclusive areas of law, fall under the civil jurisdiction of superior courts.

See also
Justice in France
Court of Cassation (France)
Cour d'assises
Agricultural Land Tribunal (Tribunal paritaire des baux ruraux)
Juge d'instruction

References

External links
 Competences of the TI, proximity jurisdiction and TGI, national Assembly (February 24 2005)
 Guide practices procedure in front of the tribunal d'instance (partie 2 partie 3)

Judiciary of France
Courts by type
Tribunals